Iceland competed at the 2020 Summer Olympics in Tokyo. Originally scheduled to take place from 24 July to 9 August 2020, the Games were postponed to 23 July to 8 August 2021, because of the COVID-19 pandemic.

Since the nation's official debut in 1912, Icelandic athletes have appeared in every edition of the Summer Olympic Games, except for four occasions as a result of the worldwide Great Depression (1920 to 1932). During the opening ceremony countries marched in the order of traditional Japanese characters using Gojūon script; therefore, Iceland was third in the parade of nations following Greece, which has traditionally led the march since 1928, and Refugee Olympic Team.

Competitors
The following is the list of number of competitors participating in the Games:

Athletics

Iceland received universality slots from IAAF to send one athletes to the Olympics.

Field events

Shooting

Iceland received the allocation spot from ISSF to send Ásgeir Sigurgeirsson in the men's pistol shooting to the Olympics, as long as the minimum qualifying score (MQS) was fulfilled.

Swimming

Icelandic swimmers further achieved qualifying standards in the following events (up to a maximum of 2 swimmers in each event at the Olympic Qualifying Time (OQT), and potentially 1 at the Olympic Selection Time (OST)):

References

External links 

Nations at the 2020 Summer Olympics
2020
2021 in Icelandic sport